NFL's Greatest Games is a series of television programs that air on NFL Network, ESPN and related networks.  They are condensed versions of some of the most famous games in the history of the National Football League, using footage and sound captured by NFL Films, as well as original interviews. All installments produced before 2015 are 90 minutes in length, and are presented with a title in respect to the game being featured. Starting in 2015, new installments produced run for either 30 minutes, 60 minutes, or 90 minutes, and no longer have a title beyond the actual game itself that is featured.

The series began with Super Bowl III, the New York Jets' 16–7 upset of the Baltimore Colts.  ESPN debuted the program in 1999, on the 30th anniversary of the original game.  More telecasts followed in the ensuing months.

In 2007, NFL Network unveiled Super Bowl Classics, a version of this program using complete videotaped games.

The "NFL's Greatest Games" banner is also occasionally used for episodes of the 1970s public television series The Way It Was that covered classic NFL games prior to 1958.

List of episodes

Super Bowls
Super Bowl III: New York Jets vs. Baltimore Colts ("When the Game Changed")
Super Bowl V: Baltimore Colts vs Dallas Cowboys ("The Blunder Bowl")
Super Bowl XIII: Pittsburgh Steelers vs. Dallas Cowboys ("Battle of Champions")
Super Bowl XXIII: Cincinnati Bengals vs.  San Francisco 49ers ("Isn't that John Candy?")
Super Bowl XXV: New York Giants vs. Buffalo Bills ("Wide Right")
Super Bowl XXXII: Green Bay Packers vs. Denver Broncos  ("This One's For John")
Super Bowl XXXIV: St. Louis Rams vs. Tennessee Titans ("The Longest Yard")
Super Bowl XXXVI: St. Louis Rams vs. New England Patriots ("A Dynasty Born")
Super Bowl XXXVIII: Carolina Panthers vs. New England Patriots ("Lonestar Shootout")
Super Bowl XLII: New York Giants vs. New England Patriots ("Not Quite Perfect”, aka “Helmet Catch”)
Super Bowl XLIII: Pittsburgh Steelers vs. Arizona Cardinals ("The Best Ever")
Super Bowl XLIV: New Orleans Saints vs. Indianapolis Colts ("Saints Marching In Miami")
Super Bowl XLV: Pittsburgh Steelers vs. Green Bay Packers ("Leader of the Pack")
Super Bowl XLVI: New York Giants vs. New England Patriots ("The Forgotten 4th Quarter")
Super Bowl XLVII: Baltimore Ravens vs. San Francisco 49ers ("The Blackout Bowl")
Super Bowl XLIX: New England Patriots vs. Seattle Seahawks ("Legacy")
Super Bowl LI: New England Patriots vs. Atlanta Falcons ("The Ultimate Comeback", aka "28–3")
Super Bowl LII: Philadelphia Eagles vs. New England Patriots ("Philly Special")
Super Bowl LV: Kansas City Chiefs vs. Tampa Bay Buccaneers ("The Bucs Stops Here")
Super Bowl LVI: Los Angeles Rams vs. Cincinnati Bengals ("Champions in La La Land")

Other games
1958 NFL Championship Game: Baltimore Colts at New York Giants ("The Greatest Game Ever Played")
1967 NFL Championship Game: Dallas Cowboys at Green Bay Packers ("The Ice Bowl")
1972 AFC Divisional Playoff Game: Oakland Raiders at Pittsburgh Steelers ("The Immaculate Reception")
1974 AFC Divisional Playoff Game: Miami Dolphins at Oakland Raiders ("The Sea of Hands")
1975 NFC Divisional Playoff Game: Dallas Cowboys at Minnesota Vikings ("The Hail Mary")
1977 AFC Divisional Playoff Game: Oakland Raiders at Baltimore Colts ("Ghost to the Post")
1980 NFC Divisional Playoff Game: Dallas Cowboys at Atlanta Falcons ("Duel in Dixie")
1981 AFC Divisional Playoff Game: San Diego Chargers at Miami Dolphins ("Epic in Miami")
1981 NFC Championship Game: Dallas Cowboys at San Francisco 49ers ("The Catch")
1983 NFC Championship Game: San Francisco 49ers at Washington Redskins ("The Forgotten Classic")
1986 AFC Divisional Playoff Game: New York Jets at Cleveland Browns ("Marathon by the Lake")
1986 AFC Championship Game: Denver Broncos at Cleveland Browns ("The Drive")
1987 AFC Championship Game: Cleveland Browns at Denver Broncos ("The Fumble")
1992 AFC Wild Card Playoff Game: Houston Oilers at Buffalo Bills ("The Comeback")
1992 NFC Championship Game: Dallas Cowboys at San Francisco 49ers ("Changing of the Guard")
1993 NFC Wild Card Playoff Game: Green Bay Packers at Detroit Lions ("Favre to Sharpe")
1995 AFC Championship Game: Indianapolis Colts at Pittsburgh Steelers ("60 Minutes")
1996 AFC Divisional Playoff Game: Jacksonville Jaguars at Denver Broncos ("Ambush at Mile High")
1998 NFC Wild Card Playoff Game: Green Bay Packers at San Francisco 49ers ("The Catch II")
1998 NFC Championship Game: Atlanta Falcons at Minnesota Vikings ("Reversal of Fortune")
1999 AFC Wild Card Playoff Game: Buffalo Bills at Tennessee Titans ("Music City Miracle")
2001 AFC Divisional Playoff Game: Oakland Raiders at New England Patriots ("Tuck Rule Game")
2002 NFC Wild Card Playoff Game: New York Giants at San Francisco 49ers ("One Wild Finish")
2003 NFC Wild Card Playoff Game: Seattle Seahawks at Green Bay Packers ("We're Gonna Score")
2003 NFC Divisional Playoff Game: Green Bay Packers at Philadelphia Eagles ("4th & 26")
2005 AFC Divisional Playoff Game: Pittsburgh Steelers at Indianapolis Colts ("The Immaculate Redemption")
2006 NFC Divisional Playoff Game: Seattle Seahawks at Chicago Bears ("A Wild One in the Windy City!")
2006 AFC Championship Game: New England Patriots at Indianapolis Colts ("Peyton's Revenge")
2007 NFC Championship Game: New York Giants at Green Bay Packers ("The Chilling Championship")
2010 NFC Wild Card Playoff Game: New Orleans Saints at Seattle Seahawks ("Beast Quake")
2011 AFC Wild Card Playoff Game: Pittsburgh Steelers at Denver Broncos ("316 Game")
2012 AFC Divisional Playoff Game: Baltimore Ravens at Denver Broncos ("Mile High Miracle")
2013 AFC Wild Card Playoff Game: Kansas City Chiefs at Indianapolis Colts ("The Lucky Comeback")
2014 NFC Wild Card Playoff Game: Detroit Lions at Dallas Cowboys ("Lions vs. Fate")
2014 NFC Divisional Playoff Game: Dallas Cowboys at Green Bay Packers ("The No-Catch")
2014 AFC Divisional Playoff Game: Baltimore Ravens at New England Patriots ("The Double Comeback")
2014 NFC Championship Game: Green Bay Packers at Seattle Seahawks ("Fourth Quarter Comeback")
2015 Green Bay Packers-Detroit Lions game: Green Bay Packers at Detroit Lions (“Miracle in Motown”)
2015 NFC Wild Card Playoff Game: Seattle Seahawks at Minnesota Vikings ("The Frostbite Fight")
2015 NFC Divisional Playoff Game: Green Bay Packers at Arizona Cardinals ("Hail Larry")
2017 NFC Divisional Playoff Game: New Orleans Saints at Minnesota Vikings ("Minneapolis Miracle")
2018 Kansas City Chiefs–Los Angeles Rams game: Kansas City Chiefs at Los Angeles Rams ("Monday Night Shootout")
2018 New England Patriots-Miami Dolphins game: New England Patriots at Miami Dolphins (“Miami Miracle”)
2018 NFC Wild Card Playoff Game: Philadelphia Eagles at Chicago Bears ("Double Doink")
2018 NFC Championship Game: Los Angeles Rams at New Orleans Saints ("The NOLA No-Call")
2018 AFC Championship Game: New England Patriots at Kansas City Chiefs (“The Epic in Arrowhead”)
2019 AFC Wild Card Playoff Game: Tennessee Titans at New England Patriots ("The End of the Dynasty")
2019 NFC Wild Card Playoff Game: Minnesota Vikings at New Orleans Saints ("Shut Down the Noise")
2019 NFC Divisional Playoff Game: Seattle Seahawks at Green Bay Packers ("Thriller in Lambeau")
2020 Buffalo Bills-Arizona Cardinals game: Buffalo Bills at Arizona Cardinals ("Hail Murray")
2020 AFC Wild Card Playoff Game: Cleveland Browns at Pittsburgh Steelers ("Same Old Browns")
2020 NFC Divisional Playoff Game: Tampa Bay Buccaneers at New Orleans Saints ("Bucs Go Marching In New Orleans")
2020 NFC Championship Game: Tampa Bay Buccaneers at Green Bay Packers ("Brady vs. Rodgers: Battle of the 12s")
2021 NFC Divisional Playoff Game: Los Angeles Rams at Tampa Bay Buccaneers ("Brady's Bequest")
2021 AFC Divisional Playoff Game: Buffalo Bills at Kansas City Chiefs ("13 Seconds")

External links
NFL's Greatest Games

ESPN original programming
Greatest Games
Greatest Games
1999 American television series debuts
2000s American television series
2010s American television series